The 2007 Glorietta explosion occurred in the Glorietta 2 section of the Glorietta shopping complex at Ayala Center in Makati, Metropolitan Manila, in the Philippines, on October 19, 2007, at around 1:25 PM PST. Initial reports indicated that the explosion originated from an LPG tank explosion in a restaurant in the mall. However, authorities were unable to confirm the true nature or source of the explosion. The blast killed eleven people and injured more than a hundred. Many of the victims were admitted at the Makati Medical Center and Ospital ng Makati.

The explosion
The explosion initially killed eleven people through shrapnel wounds, and at least 126 others were injured. The explosion was first reported to be due to an accidentally ignited LPG tank from Luk Yuen Noodle House. However, due to the extensive damage caused by the explosion, the Philippine National Police ruled this out and considered the cause to be a bomb.  Whilst there are indications that it was an accident, the possibility of a terrorist attack cannot be discounted," the FCO said in the advisory. The United Kingdom also reiterated that there is a high threat of terrorism throughout the Philippines as terrorist groups continue to plan attacks and have the capacity and the intent to carry out these attacks at any time and anywhere in the country.  The Makati Rescue deployed a total of 40 rescue personnel and four emergency medical services (EMS) doctors to conduct search and rescue operations. The initial team of 10 Rescue personnel arrived at the scene some five minutes after the explosion.

As of 7:30 PM (UTC +8), the blast has reportedly claimed at least nine fatalities and more than 100 were injured. Many of the victims were rushed on to the Makati Medical Center and the Ospital ng Makati. The National Disaster Coordinating Council (as of 5 PM Friday), identified 5 of the 11 fatalities as Lester Peregrina, Jose Alan de Jesus, Liza Enriquez and Janine Marcos, and Maureen De Leon. The latters body was recovered by Philippine National Red Cross rescue teams led by Richard Gordon. Meanwhile, the United States and the United Kingdom embassies expressed sympathy for the victims of the explosion, promising assistance to the PNP and government in the investigation. Officials also reported that 10 people were reported missing. Police investigators identified 5 of the dead and officially released the names of 34 of the injured rushed to the Makati Medical Center (as of 3 PM Friday).

As the investigation continued four days after the incident, authorities are favoring the possibility that the blast was caused by an accident and not a terrorist attack. Although traces of RDX (Cyclotrimethylenetrinitramine) were found on-site, this does not form conclusive proof that a bomb was the cause, as RDX also has commercial applications. The most probable cause, according to authorities, was the accumulation of methane gas in the building's septic tanks and as well as other combustible materials in its basement. Authorities, however, are not ruling out the possibility of a terrorist attack and are still investigating the incident to discover the true cause of the explosion.

Finally, at November 22, 2007, the Philippine National Police had concluded that the explosion is caused by gas, and not a bomb. However they still did not know how it happened. The policemen are now working on the negligence angle.

Final report and lawsuits
On January 8, 2008, Ayala Land, Inc. (ALI)'s commissioned foreign experts found that the explosion was caused by a bomb with RDX components - cyclotrimethylenetrinitramine (used in military and industrial applications, in C-4, a plastic bomb).  On January 10, 2008, Chief Superintendent Luizo Ticman announced that criminal cases of "reckless imprudence resulting in multiple homicide, physical injuries and damage to property" will be filed against: engineers Arnel Gonzales, Jowell Velvez, and Marcelo Botenes of the Ayala Property Management Corporation, and Candelario Valqueza of the Makati Supermarket Corp.; engineer Clifford Arriola, Joselito Buenaventura, Charlie Nepomuceno, Jonathan Ibuna, and Juan Ricafort of Marchem Industrial Sales and Service Inc.; for violation of the Fire Code: engineer Ricardo Cruz, operations manager of Metalline Enterprises and its foreman, Miguel Velasco; gross neglect of duty causing undue injury: Makati Fire Station Senior Fire Officer 4 Anthony Grey, SFO2 Leonilo Balais, Senior Inspector Reynaldo Enoc, and Chief Inspector Jose Embang Jr.; Makati Fire Station chief - "for simple neglect of duty-for failure to review and validate before issuing fire safety inspection certificate." Ticman stated that per final report signed by DILG Secretary Ronaldo Puno - "no bomb components were found at the basement of Glorietta 2 mall; the absence of any crater, bomb/explosive residue, or improvised explosive device in the "seat of explosion; no soot or blackening on the concave ceiling. The Multi-Agency Investigation Task Force final report detailed that the 1st blast was a methane explosion, at 1:31 PM as the "gas accumulated after knee-deep water, diesel, human and kitchen waste at the mall's allegedly poorly ventilated basement was left unattended for 76 days"; the 2nd blast was "a diesel vapor explosion, at 1:32 PM; the National Bureau of Investigation "identified the possible source of ignition" - the motor control panel of waste pumps two and three at the basement; rise in temperature caused by the methane gas triggered the 2nd explosion. The Australian Federal Police and PowerPoint copy of US ambassador Kristie Kenney's statement confirming the US experts' findings similar to the police's investigation results supported the MAITF's findings. On January 11, 2008, Chief Supt. Luizo Ticman personally filed the complaint against the 15 accused at the Department of Justice in Manila.

On January 16, 2008, Kit Collier, an International Crisis Group consultant / international terror and insurgency expert, told foreign media members at the Annual Prospects Forum, Mandarin Hotel, Makati, that he doubted the delayed final report of  the Philippine National Police's findings that Glorietta 2  blast was due to a gas explosion. Kit noted the traces of RDX, or cyclotrimethylenetrinitramine, an explosive component, found in the site. Malaysian expert Aini Ling, commissioned by Ayala Land Inc.'s (ALI) paid investigation, stated in her report, that a bomb caused the explosion, due to RDX traces at the blast site. Meanwhile, Justice Secretary Raul M. Gonzalez will conduct the preliminary investigation on the criminal complaints filed by police.

On January 22, 2008, Secretary Gonzalez absolved Ayala Land, Inc. (ALI), the attached company of holding company for Real Estate Ayala Corporation, from liability in the 2007 Glorietta explosion. But Gonzalez stated that Ayala Property Management, Inc. (APMC) is still under investigation.

The Department of Justice's "Task Force Glorietta" on May 22, 2008, recommended the filing of criminal cases of "reckless imprudence resulting in homicide and multiple physical injuries" against 8 accused : Candelario Valdueza, project engineer of Makati Supermarket Corp. (MSC), Clifford Arriola, operations manager of Marchem Industrial Sales and Services Inc.; Joselito Buenaventura, Marchem supervisor; Charlie Nepomuceno, Jonathan Ibuna, and Juan Ricaport, all Marchem maintenance personnel; Engr. Ricardo Cruz, operations manager of Metalline Enterprises, and foreman Miguel Velasco Jr. The report however cleared the other suspects. The 51-page resolution denied Ayala Land Inc. (ALI)'s  bomb explosion theory and upheld the police's biogas explosion evidence, but it absolved the Ayala mall owners, and Ayala Land engineers Marcelo Botanes, Jowell Velvez, and Arnel Gonzalez, for reasons: “It is uncontroverted that the Makati Supermarkt Building is owned by the Makati Supermarket Corporation (MSC) not by Ayala Land Inc. (ALI), which are separate and distinct entities; None of the equipment in the [supermarket] basement is owned, supplied, or designed by ALI.”

Settlement
Included were Marie de Jesus, Melanie Arroyo, Carlo Cruz, and Amado Pertas, among others.

Casualties
On October 21, 2007, the following information was officially released per the National Disaster Coordinating Council's report.

Casualties:
 11 dead

Note: Out of the total injured persons, 95 have been discharged from the following hospitals:
 Ospital ng Makati (32)
 Makati Medical Center (63)

Aftermath
National Capital Region Police Office (NCRPO) Dir. Gen. Geary Barias officially stated on ANC’s Crossroads:
{{cquote|As of 8:00 this evening [October 19], we have accounted for eight casualties and 129 injured. They are scattered I think in two hospitals in Makati,}}
The day after the blast, normal operations continued in the Glorietta Malls after engineers inspecting the remaining parts of the mall found these structurally sound. Glorietta 2 remained closed, and some of the stores in the rest of the mall, mostly fast-food chains, remained closed.

On October 23, 2007, it was revealed on national television that closed-circuit TV cameras in the mall recorded actual scenes of the explosion. Camera 12 recorded scenes at the Glorietta 2 ground floor entrance, while Camera 10 recorded scenes of Glorietta 2's bookstore.

As part of the Ayala Center redevelopment, tenants of Glorietta 1 and 2 were given an option to relocate to the newly constructed Glorietta 5; Glorietta 1 and 2 underwent reconstruction, with the addition of two office buildings, Holiday Inn & Suites Makati, and a roof deck called Top of the Glo. Tenants accepted the option, moving them until January 1, 2010.

Reaction
Ayala Land has promised to cover the medical bills of all who were injured by the explosion. They have yet to return the vehicles stranded in the Glorietta 2 parking lot (Park Square 2) to the rightful owners. The United States and the United Kingdom, through their respective embassies expressed sympathy for the victims of the explosion, promising assistance to the Philippine government and Philippine National Police in the investigation. President Gloria Macapagal Arroyo stated that there would be a full investigation of the explosion. She also said that the Philippine police and military were on their highest alert status, and that an additional 2,000 security officers were being deployed in public areas.

In media
The 2007 blast was featured in a 2009 episode of GMA Network's Case Unclosed'' hosted by Arnold Clavio.

See also
 2013 Serendra explosion, another explosion involving an Ayala Land property
 2017 Davao City mall fire, another shopping mall-related incident in the Philippines

References

External links

 The Glorietta Blast, a Special Microsite for the Tragedy in Glorietta - from the Philippine Daily Inquirer
   abs-cbnnews.com,  Initial photos in Makati blast
  manilatimes.net, Chronology of events
  GMA NEWS.TV,  Report on Glorietta 2 explosion posted online
  pnp.gov.ph/press, Glorietta 2 Explosion Report
 Ayala Land Corporate Website

Makati Central Business District
Glorietta Explosion, 2007
2007 industrial disasters
Explosions in 2007
History of Metro Manila
Makati